is a former Japanese football player.

Club career 
Kozo began his career with Yokohama Flügels and played later for the Waseda University. In 2002, he left Waseda University. He was now scouted by J1 League club JEF United Ichihara (later JEF United Chiba). He debuted in 2003 and played many matches as center back from 2004. JEF United won the champions in 2005 and 2006 J.League Cup. However he could hardly play in the match from 2007. After seven years for JEF United, he moved to J2 League club Sanfrecce Hiroshima in June 2008. He played many matches as substitute defender and Sanfrecce won the champions in 2008 J2 League. However he resigned end of 2008 season. After half-year blank, On 20 July 2009, the 2. Bundesliga club Fortuna Düsseldorf signed the Japanese defender until the end of the year.

Club statistics

References

External links

1979 births
Living people
Waseda University alumni
Association football people from Kanagawa Prefecture
Japanese footballers
Japanese expatriate footballers
J1 League players
J2 League players
2. Bundesliga players
JEF United Chiba players
Sanfrecce Hiroshima players
Fortuna Düsseldorf players
Japanese expatriate sportspeople in Germany
Expatriate footballers in Germany
Association football defenders